Patrick Müller (born 17 December 1976) is a Swiss former professional footballer who played as a defender.

Club career

Meyrin, Servette
Born in Geneva, to German father and Swiss mother from Lausanne Müller began his children's football with local club FC Meyrin before he moved to the youth department of Servette in 1994. One year later he advanced to their first team and immediately became regular starter. In 1998 he received his first international call up. In the 1998–99 Nationalliga A season he won the Swiss championship with Servette.

Juventus
While Müller was playing in one of his first international matches, he was watched by a scout from Juventus and soon afterwards offered a contract. Müller signed for five-years and his contract would have run from January 1999, but Müller didn't want to make the move until the summer. It never came to a match or a training with Juve, but they loaned him out inside Switzerland.

Grasshoppers
Only a few weeks after signing with Juve, Müller signed a loan contact with Grasshoppers in Zürich. Immediately he was a starter in their team. The loan contract ran over one year, but in summer 1999 GC bought Müller out of this contract and signed him definatively. Then on 24 May 2000 it was announced that Müller would leave GC and join Olympique Lyonnais on a four-year contract. It was also reported that the transfer fee was the equivalent of 12.75 million Swiss francs, which was the highest amount ever paid for a Swiss player to that time.

Lyon
Müller's talent had been noted by the French club Olympique Lyonnais, who signed him in summer 2000. In his first season with Lyon they became league runners-up and the following year they won the championship. They repeated this success three consecutive times.

Mallorca
In summer 2004 Müller signed for Spanish club Real Mallorca on a free transfer. However, the deal never worked out and Müller later regarded his move as set back in his career. Because he only had six appearances, two of which as substitute, after just a few months he ended the contact with the club prematurely.

Basel
On 7 January 2005 it was announced that Müller had signed for FC Basel on a two-and-a-half year contract. He joined Basel's first team during the winter break of their 2004–05 season under head coach Christian Gross. After playing in seven test games, Müller played his debut for the club in the home game in the St. Jakob-Park on 17 February 2005 as Basel played a goalless draw with Lille OSC in the round of 32 in the 2004–05 UEFA Cup. He played his domestic league debut with the team just three days later on 20 February, in the away game in the Espenmoos as Basel were defeated 3–1 by St. Gallen. Basel completed all the 2004–05 Super League season's seventeen home games undefeated, winning thirteen and drawing four. They ended the season as Swiss champions with 10 points advantage over second placed Thun.

During the winter break of the following season, former club Lyon again showed interest in the defender. On 26 January 2006 the deal was completed. During his time with the club, Müller played a total of 51 games for Basel scoring one goal. 28 of these games were in the Swiss Super League, two in the Swiss Cup, seven in the UEFA Cup and 14 were friendly games. He scored his goal during the test games.

Lyon
Müller rejoined Olympique Lyonnais during the winter break of the 2005–06 Ligue 1 season. At the end of the season Müller again won the championship with the club. Again they repeated this success three consecutive times. The first time Müller was a regular starter, but in the other two he was only in supporting roles and did not play very often.

Monaco
On 31 August 2008 Müller moved from Lyon to AS Monaco on a free transfer and he signed a two year contract with them. However, after a few appearances he was no longer considered for the first team. He played his last game in spring 2009. But, despite looking for a new club he was not successful and he remained with the club for the duration of the contract.

International career
Müller played for the Swiss national football team on a regular basis and was called into the squad for the 2006 World Cup. He is infamous for several incidents where he blocked balls with his hands during the 2006 World Cup.

He represented the national team at 2008 UEFA Euro, where the team showed good performance in the tournament, achieving the best result at the time.

Personal life
Müller has a wife named Katia and has two children, daughter Norah (born 30 April 2004) and son Dan (born 5 March 2006). He holds dual nationality, Swiss and Austrian.

Honours
Lyon
Ligue 1: 2001-02, 2002-03, 2003-04, 2005-06, 2006-07, 2007-08
Coupe de France: 2007-08  
Coupe de la Ligue: 2000-01 
Trophée des Champions: 2002, 2003, 2006, 2007
Basel
Swiss Super League: 2004–05

References

Sources
 Die ersten 125 Jahre. Publisher: Josef Zindel im Friedrich Reinhardt Verlag, Basel. 
 Verein "Basler Fussballarchiv" Homepage

External links

 
 

Living people
1976 births
Association football defenders
Swiss men's footballers
Swiss expatriate sportspeople in Spain
Swiss expatriate sportspeople in France
Swiss expatriate sportspeople in Monaco
Switzerland international footballers
FC Meyrin players
Servette FC players
Grasshopper Club Zürich players
Olympique Lyonnais players
RCD Mallorca players
FC Basel players
AS Monaco FC players
La Liga players
Swiss Super League players
Ligue 1 players
UEFA Euro 2004 players
2006 FIFA World Cup players
UEFA Euro 2008 players
Swiss-German people
Swiss expatriate footballers
Expatriate footballers in Spain
Expatriate footballers in France
Expatriate footballers in Monaco
Footballers from Geneva